Aggravation is a board game for up to four players and later versions for up to six players, whose object is to be the first player to have all four playing pieces (usually represented by marbles) reach the player's home section of the board. The game's name comes from the action of capturing an opponent's piece by landing on its space, which is known as "aggravating". Captioned by one of the creators, Lois Elaine, who did not always enjoy defeat. 

Aggravation was originally created by BERL Industries and sold for royalties of 1 penny per game sold. It was previously owned by Milton Bradley and Parker Bros.  Today, it is manufactured by Hasbro. The children and grandchildren of the creators still hold rights to all game boards and sales. 

Its distinctive features are that the track accommodates from four to six players, unlike other Pachisi-like games which only allow four; that it is normally drilled to accept colored glass marbles as playing pieces; and that it incorporates "shortcuts". There are no "safe" holes where a player's marbles cannot be captured (or "aggravated", in the game's parlance) other than the player's own base and home sections.

Older versions of the game usually feature a board which is perfectly symmetrical and identical in shape and size from all angles. In addition, older versions allowed up to four players instead of six. However, modern versions of the game produced by Parker Brothers are made in an irregular pattern with a shape that varies for each player, though all players must travel an equal number of spaces in order to reach their respective home sections.

Sequence of play
The game starts with each player placing four marbles in his or her "base". After the order of play is determined through the rolling of the die, each player rolls a single die on each turn to determine the number of spaces to move. All marbles remain in the base until either a 1 or 6 is rolled, which entitles the player to move a marble from the base to his or her "start", the first step before entering the track. While this is considered a turn, and the move takes place in lieu of moving a marble that number of spaces, a six, if rolled, entitles a player to another turn whenever a legal move can be made.  

The winner is the first player whose pieces all reach home by exact count. If playing partners when your partner has all their marbles in home then they can roll to help get your marbles home faster.

Shortcuts
The hole in the center of the board is known as the "short cut". A player who is able to land a marble in this location by exact count has the option of taking a route even faster to home. The short cut, though, has the drawback in that it may only be exited by rolling a 1.

Aggravating
A player who lands a marble on a space occupied by an opponent's marble "aggravates" that player's piece and sends it back to that player's base. A player's piece may not be aggravated if it is on the player's home or base areas, as these are safe from aggravation.  A player’s Start space is not specified as protected. 

Players are prohibited from landing on or passing their own marble. If it happens that they cannot move the full die roll, then they can not move. If you rolled a 6 then you may roll again. If playing teams, you cannot land on or pass your partner. If, however, there are multiple marbles, you can't jump over or aggravate a marble in the middle or front.

Reviews
Games and Puzzles

References

Board games introduced in 1962
Cross and circle games
Parker Brothers games
Racing board games